Krissy Nordhoff (born June 24, 1974; as Kristen Lynn Stora) is an American Christian musician, who primarily plays a Christian pop style of worship music. She has released two studio albums, Thank Him in 2004 and Downpour in 2007, both with ICC Records. She was awarded with a GMA Dove Award, for her songwriting on "Your Great Name", where it won Worship Song of the Year at the 43rd GMA Dove Awards.

Early life
Nordhoff was born Kristen Lynn Stora on June 24, 1974, in Allegan, Michigan. She suffered with Lyme disease in 2002 where she got a tick bite in 1999, but she has since made a full recovery from illness.

Music career
Nordhoff's music recording career commenced in 2004, when her first studio album, Thank Him, was released on November 1, 2004 by ICC Records. Her subsequent studio album, Downpour, was released on September 10, 2007, with ICC Records. She won a GMA Dove Award, for Worship Song of the Year at the 43rd GMA Dove Awards, due to her songwriting of her songwriting on "Your Great Name", performed by Natalie Grant on her 2010 studio album, Love Revolution.

Personal life
She is married to Eric Nordhoff, where together they reside in Franklin, Tennessee, attending Gateway Church located in their hometown, with their three children, two sons and a daughter.

Discography
Studio albums
Thank Him (November 1, 2004, ICC)
Downpour (September 10, 2007, ICC)

References

External links
 Official website

1974 births
Living people
American performers of Christian music
Musicians from Michigan
Musicians from Tennessee
Songwriters from Michigan
Songwriters from Tennessee